Gerhard Glogowski (born 11 February 1943) is a German politician of the Social Democratic Party (SPD).

Education
Born in Hanover, Glogowski finished public school in Bonn and later completed an apprenticeship as toolmaker. In parallel, he attended night school where he finished his Abitur. Then he studied at the University of Economics and Politics in Hamburg until the end as a graduate economist.

Political career
Glogowski grew up in Bonn, his father was a chauffeur of the SPD politician Herbert Wehner and Erich Ollenhauer.

Since 1960, Glogowski is member of the IG Metall.

Glogowski started his political career in 1972 as Mayor of the city district of Waggum in Brunswick. He changed in 1976 upon the chair as Lord Mayor of Brunswick until 1981 and again from 1986 until 1990.

In the meantime, Glogowski was elected as an MP of Lower Saxony in 1978. He maintained the position until 2004.

After the state election in 1990, he was interior minister of Lower Saxony from 21 June 1990 until 27 October 1998 in Gerhard Schröder's cabinet.
He succeeded Schröder as Prime Minister of Lower Saxony from 28 October 1998 until 26 November 1999. Glogowski stepped back from this office after various financial irregularities had become public; among other issues, he was accused of accepting coffee and beer for a private party from local companies.

Life after politics
After seven and a half years as president of Eintracht Braunschweig, Glogowski was elected honorary president of the club in 2007.

On 18 December 2007, the Council of the City of Brunswick voted for Glogowski to be awarded the honorary citizenship of Brunswick. The appointment took place on 11 February 2008.

In 1998, Glogowski declared about the far-right political parties in Germany:

References

1943 births
Living people
Politicians from Hanover
Social Democratic Party of Germany politicians
German football chairmen and investors
Ministers-President of Lower Saxony
Ministers of the Lower Saxony State Government